is a Japanese pro-wrestling-themed tokusatsu/anime superhero television series produced by Tsuburaya Productions, and created by Go Nagai and Ken Ishikawa. Nagai and Ishikawa created three manga series, simply named , published in different magazines by Shogakukan. None of them are related between them or the TV show. They were compiled in a single tankōbon in 1978 (Futabasha), 1986 (Asahi Sonorama) and 2001 (Futabasha).

This primarily live-action series is unique, in that, during each climactic battle with the weekly demonic menace, the titular wrestling superhero is able to transform his entire live-action surroundings into anime footage, enabling him to perform superhuman wrestling techniques that are otherwise impossible to perform in live-action.

See also
List of professional wrestling television series

References

External links
Pro-Wres no Hoshi Aztecaser at allcinema
Aztekaiser (manga) at d/visual
Battle Hawk & Aztecaser (manga) at The World of Go Nagai webpage
(Italian) Aztekaiser, il tokusatsu di Go Nagai e Ken Ishikawa at Go Nagai World.

1976 Japanese television series debuts
1977 Japanese television series endings
Futabasha manga
Go Nagai
Japanese television series with live action and animation
Ken Ishikawa
Tsuburaya Productions
Martial arts television series
Professional wrestling television series
Tokusatsu television series
TV Asahi original programming